The observer-expectancy effect (also called the experimenter-expectancy effect, expectancy bias, observer effect, or experimenter effect) is a form of reactivity in which a researcher's cognitive bias causes them to subconsciously influence the participants of an experiment. Confirmation bias can lead to the experimenter interpreting results incorrectly because of the tendency to look for information that conforms to their hypothesis, and overlook information that argues against it. It is a significant threat to a study's internal validity, and is therefore typically controlled using a double-blind experimental design.

It may include conscious or unconscious influences on subject behavior including creation of demand characteristics that influence subjects, and altered or selective recording of experimental results themselves.

Overview 
The experimenter may introduce cognitive bias into a study in several ways. In what is called the observer-expectancy effect, the experimenter may subtly communicate their expectations for the outcome of the study to the participants, causing them to alter their behavior to conform to those expectations. Such observer bias effects are near-universal in human data interpretation under expectation and in the presence of imperfect cultural and methodological norms that promote or enforce objectivity.

The classic example of experimenter bias is that of "Clever Hans", an Orlov Trotter horse claimed by his owner von Osten to be able to do arithmetic and other tasks. As a result of the large public interest in Clever Hans, philosopher and psychologist Carl Stumpf, along with his assistant Oskar Pfungst, investigated these claims. Ruling out simple fraud, Pfungst determined that the horse could answer correctly even when von Osten did not ask the questions. However, the horse was unable to answer correctly when either it could not see the questioner, or if the questioner themselves was unaware of the correct answer: When von Osten knew the answers to the questions, Hans answered correctly 89% of the time. However, when von Osten did not know the answers, Hans guessed only 6% of questions correctly.

Pfungst then proceeded to examine the behaviour of the questioner in detail, and showed that as the horse's taps approached the right answer, the questioner's posture and facial expression changed in ways that were consistent with an increase in tension, which was released when the horse made the final, correct tap. This provided a cue that the horse had learned to use as a reinforced cue to stop tapping.

Experimenter-bias also influences human subjects. As an example, researchers compared performance of two groups given the same task (rating portrait pictures and estimating how successful each individual was on a scale of −10 to 10), but with different experimenter expectations.

In one group, ("Group A"), experimenters were told to expect positive ratings while in another group, ("Group B"), experimenters were told to expect negative ratings. Data collected from Group A was a significant and substantially more optimistic appraisal than the data collected from Group B. The researchers suggested that experimenters gave subtle but clear cues with which the subjects complied.

Prevention

Double blind techniques may be employed to combat bias by causing the experimenter and subject to be ignorant of which condition data flows from.

It might be thought that, due to the central limit theorem of statistics, collecting more independent measurements will improve the precision of estimates, thus decreasing bias. However, this assumes that the measurements are statistically independent. In the case of experimenter bias, the measures share correlated bias: simply averaging such data will not lead to a better statistic but may merely reflect the correlations among the individual measurements and their non-independent nature.

See also

 List of cognitive biases
 Allegiance bias
 Cultural bias
 Demand characteristics
 Epistemic feedback
 Funding bias
 Hawthorne effect
 N rays – imaginary radiation
 Naturalistic observation
 Observer bias
 Participant observer
 Placebo and Nocebo
 Publication bias
 Pygmalion effect – teachers who expect higher achievement from some children actually get it
 Reality tunnel
 Reflexivity (social theory)
 Subject-expectancy effect
 Systematic bias
 White-hat bias

References

External links
 Skeptic's Dictionary on the Experimenter Effect

Design of experiments
Cognitive inertia